Artace is a genus of moths in the family Lasiocampidae. The genus was erected by Francis Walker in 1855.

Species
Artace aemula Draudt, 1927
Artace albicans Walker, 1855
Artace anula Schaus, 1892
Artace argentina Schaus, 1924
Artace athoria Schaus, 1936
Artace cinerosipalpis Bryk, 1953
Artace colaria Franclemont, 1973
Artace connecta Draudt, 1927
Artace coprea Draudt, 1927
Artace cribrarius Ljungh, 1825
Artace etta Schaus, 1936
Artace helier Schaus, 1924
Artace lilloi Giacomelli, 1911
Artace litterata Dognin, 1923
Artace melanda Schaus, 1936
Artace menuve Schaus, 1924
Artace meridionalis Schaus, 1892
Artace muzophila Dognin, 1916
Artace nigripalpis Dognin, 1923
Artace obumbrata Köhler, 1951
Artace pelia Schaus, 1936
Artace punctistriga
Artace punctivena Walker, 1855
Artace randa Schaus, 1936
Artace regalis E. D. Jones, 1921
Artace rosea Draudt, 1927
Artace rubripalpis
Artace schreiteria Schaus, 1936
Artace sisoes Schaus, 1924
Artace thelma Schaus, 1936

See also
 Venezuelan poodle moth

References

Lasiocampidae
Moth genera